Servant of Love is the ninth studio album by American singer-songwriter Patty Griffin. It was independently released on September 25, 2015, in conjunction with Thirty Tigers. It was nominated for the Grammy Award for Best Folk Album.

Promotion
The first song released from the album was "Rider of Days," in late July 2015. On August 12, 2015, the song "There Isn't One Way" was premiered exclusively by The Wall Street Journal.

Track listing

Personnel

Musicians
 Conrad Choucroun – drums
 Shawn Colvin – lead vocals, background vocals
 John Deaderick – accordion, piano
 Patty Griffin – composer, mandolin, piano, lead vocals 
 Scrappy Jud Newcombe – electric guitar
 Ephraim Owens – trumpet
 David Pulkingham – acoustic guitar, electric guitar
 Craig Ross – bass guitar, drones, drums, acoustic guitar, baritone guitar, Hammond B3 organ
 Lindsey Verrill – bowed bass
 Ralph White – Kalimba

Production
 Gina Binkley – design
 David Boyle – engineer
 Joe Gastwirt – mastering
 Patty Griffin – producer
 Jerry Holmes – technical support
 David McClister – photography
 Beth Middleworth – design
 Cindi Peters – production service
 Mike Poole – mixing
 Craig Ross – engineer, producer
 Mishka Westell – cover illustration

Chart performance

References

2015 albums
Patty Griffin albums